The A29 is a main road in England in Surrey and chiefly in West Sussex that runs for .

Route
The road starts at the Beare Green roundabout with the A24 in Capel, south of Dorking. It passes minor villages, bypasses Billingshurst and crosses Pulborough not on its major axis. The A29 then crosses the South Downs at Bury Hill and passes Fontwell Park Racecourse before terminating on the B2259 in Bognor Regis.

For long-distance travel, the route is not a trunk road, as designated by Highways England and as such is of standard road width, often alongside hedges and open fields.

From Capel to Hardham, south of Pulborough, the road with notable deviations follows the path of one of the multiple Roman roads with the name Stane Street, the Middle English and Old English for Stone Street due to the remaining building materials.

A narrow-gauge railway was built to construct the Dorking Bypass section.

References

Roads in Surrey
Roads in West Sussex